Mayorga (IPA: [mɐ'jɔɾgɐ]), officially the Municipality of Mayorga, is a 5th class municipality in the province of Leyte, Philippines. According to the 2020 census, it has a population of 18,071 people.

The town was created in 1954 from the barrios of Mayorga, Andres Bonifacio, Talisay, San Roque, Burgos, Liberty, Union, Ormocay, Wilson, and the southern portion of barrio of Cogon Bingcay which were then a part of Dulag.

History

Mayorga at first was a barrio under the municipality of Dulag. The name first appeared in the record of localities in 1865 when Capitan Lorenzo de Paz, gobernadorcillo of Dulag, created the barrio. The name was suggested by Fr. Victoriano Sela, a Franciscan Friar and the parish priest of Dulag at the time.

Originally the name was Mallorca, the name of the hometown of Fr. Sela. The name presumably suggests the presence of palm trees in the locality, as the island of Mallorca (IPA: [ma'ʝorka]) in Spain was famous for its luxurious growth of palms. However, the natives found some difficulty in pronouncing the name. Whether the natural evolution and popular usage corrupted the name "Mallorca" into the present "Mayorga," or whether the transformation was sanctioned by official decree motivated by phonetic convenience is not known. Nevertheless, the original "Mallorca" has evolved into its present name.

Geography

Barangays
Mayorga is politically subdivided into 16 barangays. In 1957, the sitios of Picas, Guintulayan, and Bañgag were converted into barrios and renamed Santa Cruz, General Antonio Luna, and Calipayan, respectively.
 A. Bonifacio
 Mabini
 Burgos
 Calipayan
 Camansi
 General Antonio Luna
 Liberty
 Ormocay
 Poblacion Zone 1
 Poblacion Zone 2
 Poblacion Zone 3
 San Roque
 Santa Cruz
 Talisay
 Union
 Wilson

Climate

Demographics

Economy

References

External links

 [ Philippine Standard Geographic Code]
Philippine Census Information
Local Governance Performance Management System 

Municipalities of Leyte (province)